The Navy Midshipmen football statistical leaders are individual statistical leaders of the Navy Midshipmen football program in various categories, including passing, rushing, receiving, total offense, defensive stats, and kicking. Within those areas, the lists identify single-game, single-season, and career leaders. The Midshipmen represent the United States Naval Academy in the NCAA's American Athletic Conference.

Although Navy began competing in intercollegiate football in 1879, the school's official record book considers the "modern era" to have begun in 1938. Records from before this year are often incomplete and inconsistent, and they are generally not included in these lists.

These lists are dominated by more recent players for several reasons:
 Since 1938, seasons have increased from 10 games to 11 and then 12 games in length.
 The NCAA didn't allow freshmen to play varsity football until 1972 (with the exception of the World War II years), allowing players to have four-year careers.
 Bowl games only began counting toward single-season and career statistics in 2002. The Midshipmen have played in 15 bowls since then, allowing recent players an extra game almost every year to accumulate statistics.
 Navy also played in the American Athletic Conference Championship Game in 2016, giving players in that season yet another game to accumulate statistics.
 Navy tends to run a triple option offense, which emphasizes running with the quarterback and multiple running backs. This has allowed quarterbacks like Keenan Reynolds and Ricky Dobbs to appear high on both rushing and passing lists.

These lists are updated through the end of the 2019 season.

Passing

Passing yards

Passing touchdowns

Rushing

Rushing yards

Rushing touchdowns

Receiving

Receptions

Receiving yards

Receiving touchdowns

Total offense
Total offense is the sum of passing and rushing statistics. It does not include receiving or returns.

Total offense yards

Total touchdowns

Defense

Interceptions

Tackles

Sacks

Kicking

Field goals made

References

Navy